Promyshlenny constituency (No.162) is a Russian legislative constituency in Samara Oblast. Until 2007 the constituency covered northern Samara and its suburbs, however, in 2016 the constituency changed significantly and now it covers parts of Samara and east-central Samara Oblast.

Members

Election results

1993

|-
! colspan=2 style="background-color:#E9E9E9;text-align:left;vertical-align:top;" |Candidate
! style="background-color:#E9E9E9;text-align:left;vertical-align:top;" |Party
! style="background-color:#E9E9E9;text-align:right;" |Votes
! style="background-color:#E9E9E9;text-align:right;" |%
|-
|style="background-color:"|
|align=left|Nikolay Chukanov
|align=left|Independent
|
|25.48%
|-
| colspan="5" style="background-color:#E9E9E9;"|
|- style="font-weight:bold"
| colspan="3" style="text-align:left;" | Total
| 
| 100%
|-
| colspan="5" style="background-color:#E9E9E9;"|
|- style="font-weight:bold"
| colspan="4" |Source:
|
|}

1995

|-
! colspan=2 style="background-color:#E9E9E9;text-align:left;vertical-align:top;" |Candidate
! style="background-color:#E9E9E9;text-align:left;vertical-align:top;" |Party
! style="background-color:#E9E9E9;text-align:right;" |Votes
! style="background-color:#E9E9E9;text-align:right;" |%
|-
|style="background-color:"|
|align=left|Albert Makashov
|align=left|Communist Party
|
|32.52%
|-
|style="background-color:#F5821F"|
|align=left|German Shatsky
|align=left|Bloc of Independents
|
|11.92%
|-
|style="background-color:#E98282"|
|align=left|Valentina Zhuravleva
|align=left|Women of Russia
|
|8.73%
|-
|style="background-color:#DA2021"|
|align=left|Nikolay Chukanov (incumbent)
|align=left|Ivan Rybkin Bloc
|
|8.38%
|-
|style="background-color:"|
|align=left|Sergey Arsentyev
|align=left|Independent
|
|6.22%
|-
|style="background-color:#1C1A0D"|
|align=left|Nina Vyalova
|align=left|Forward, Russia!
|
|3.90%
|-
|style="background-color:"|
|align=left|Vitaly Gusenkov
|align=left|Independent
|
|3.32%
|-
|style="background-color:#3A46CE"|
|align=left|Vadim Kalakutsky
|align=left|Democratic Choice of Russia – United Democrats
|
|3.17%
|-
|style="background-color:"|
|align=left|Valery Kirillov
|align=left|Independent
|
|2.84%
|-
|style="background-color:#265BAB"|
|align=left|Aleksandr Paulov
|align=left|Russian Lawyers' Association
|
|2.65%
|-
|style="background-color:"|
|align=left|Aleksandr Tverdokhleb
|align=left|Democratic Russia and Free Trade Unions
|
|1.09%
|-
|style="background-color:"|
|align=left|Aleksey Syzgantsev
|align=left|Independent
|
|0.95%
|-
|style="background-color:#A8A821"|
|align=left|Dmitry Minyukov
|align=left|Stable Russia
|
|0.86%
|-
|style="background-color:"|
|align=left|Anatoly Osaulenko
|align=left|Independent
|
|0.28%
|-
|style="background-color:#000000"|
|colspan=2 |against all
|
|10.59%
|-
| colspan="5" style="background-color:#E9E9E9;"|
|- style="font-weight:bold"
| colspan="3" style="text-align:left;" | Total
| 
| 100%
|-
| colspan="5" style="background-color:#E9E9E9;"|
|- style="font-weight:bold"
| colspan="4" |Source:
|
|}

1999

|-
! colspan=2 style="background-color:#E9E9E9;text-align:left;vertical-align:top;" |Candidate
! style="background-color:#E9E9E9;text-align:left;vertical-align:top;" |Party
! style="background-color:#E9E9E9;text-align:right;" |Votes
! style="background-color:#E9E9E9;text-align:right;" |%
|-
|style="background-color:#1042A5"|
|align=left|Vera Lekareva
|align=left|Union of Right Forces
|
|28.17%
|-
|style="background-color:"|
|align=left|Vasily Cheryomushkin
|align=left|Unity
|
|16.91%
|-
|style="background-color:"|
|align=left|Alla Demina
|align=left|Independent
|
|9.71%
|-
|style="background-color:#FCCA19"|
|align=left|Anatoly Povlyuchenko
|align=left|Congress of Russian Communities-Yury Boldyrev Movement
|
|5.75%
|-
|style="background-color:"|
|align=left|Allan Chumak
|align=left|Independent
|
|3.17%
|-
|style="background-color:"|
|align=left|Yury Venediktov
|align=left|Liberal Democratic Party
|
|3.04%
|-
|style="background-color:"|
|align=left|Rinat Akhmedshin
|align=left|Independent
|
|1.99%
|-
|style="background-color:#020266"|
|align=left|Aleksandr Kokorev
|align=left|Russian Socialist Party
|
|1.51%
|-
|style="background-color:#000000"|
|colspan=2 |against all
|
|26.41%
|-
| colspan="5" style="background-color:#E9E9E9;"|
|- style="font-weight:bold"
| colspan="3" style="text-align:left;" | Total
| 
| 100%
|-
| colspan="5" style="background-color:#E9E9E9;"|
|- style="font-weight:bold"
| colspan="4" |Source:
|
|}

2003

|-
! colspan=2 style="background-color:#E9E9E9;text-align:left;vertical-align:top;" |Candidate
! style="background-color:#E9E9E9;text-align:left;vertical-align:top;" |Party
! style="background-color:#E9E9E9;text-align:right;" |Votes
! style="background-color:#E9E9E9;text-align:right;" |%
|-
|style="background-color:"|
|align=left|Albert Makashov
|align=left|Communist Party
|
|33.09%
|-
|style="background-color:"|
|align=left|Vera Lekareva (incumbent)
|align=left|Independent
|
|18.49%
|-
|style="background-color:"|
|align=left|Mikhail Fedorov
|align=left|United Russia
|
|16.85%
|-
|style="background-color:"|
|align=left|Svetlana Batishcheva
|align=left|Yabloko
|
|4.44%
|-
|style="background-color:"|
|align=left|Yury Venediktov
|align=left|Liberal Democratic Party
|
|4.28%
|-
|style="background-color:"|
|align=left|Vitaly Gusenkov
|align=left|Independent
|
|2.83%
|-
|style="background-color:#00A1FF"|
|align=left|Aleksandr Telegin
|align=left|Party of Russia's Rebirth-Russian Party of Life
|
|1.32%
|-
|style="background-color:"|
|align=left|Viktor Guzhov
|align=left|Independent
|
|1.19%
|-
|style="background-color:#164C8C"|
|align=left|Denis Kolosov
|align=left|United Russian Party Rus'
|
|1.10%
|-
|style="background-color:"|
|align=left|Sergey Sidorov
|align=left|Independent
|
|0.50%
|-
|style="background-color:#000000"|
|colspan=2 |against all
|
|14.27%
|-
| colspan="5" style="background-color:#E9E9E9;"|
|- style="font-weight:bold"
| colspan="3" style="text-align:left;" | Total
| 
| 100%
|-
| colspan="5" style="background-color:#E9E9E9;"|
|- style="font-weight:bold"
| colspan="4" |Source:
|
|}

2016

|-
! colspan=2 style="background-color:#E9E9E9;text-align:left;vertical-align:top;" |Candidate
! style="background-color:#E9E9E9;text-align:left;vertical-align:top;" |Party
! style="background-color:#E9E9E9;text-align:right;" |Votes
! style="background-color:#E9E9E9;text-align:right;" |%
|-
|style="background-color:"|
|align=left|Igor Stankevich
|align=left|United Russia
|
|46.71%
|-
|style="background-color:"|
|align=left|Konstantin Ryadnov
|align=left|Communist Party
|
|13.79%
|-
|style="background-color:"|
|align=left|Yury Venediktov
|align=left|Liberal Democratic Party
|
|11.17%
|-
|style="background:"| 
|align=left|Vera Lekareva
|align=left|A Just Russia
|
|7.94%
|-
|style="background:"| 
|align=left|Vladimir Obukhov
|align=left|Civic Platform
|
|4.97%
|-
|style="background:"| 
|align=left|Sergey Igumenov
|align=left|Communists of Russia
|
|3.63%
|-
|style="background:"| 
|align=left|Aleksandr Semerozubov
|align=left|Yabloko
|
|2.43%
|-
|style="background:"| 
|align=left|Anton Guskov
|align=left|Party of Growth
|
|1.88%
|-
|style="background-color:"|
|align=left|Yekaterina Parkhomenko
|align=left|Independent
|
|1.88%
|-
|style="background:"| 
|align=left|Anton Puntok
|align=left|People's Freedom Party
|
|1.04%
|-
| colspan="5" style="background-color:#E9E9E9;"|
|- style="font-weight:bold"
| colspan="3" style="text-align:left;" | Total
| 
| 100%
|-
| colspan="5" style="background-color:#E9E9E9;"|
|- style="font-weight:bold"
| colspan="4" |Source:
|
|}

2021

|-
! colspan=2 style="background-color:#E9E9E9;text-align:left;vertical-align:top;" |Candidate
! style="background-color:#E9E9E9;text-align:left;vertical-align:top;" |Party
! style="background-color:#E9E9E9;text-align:right;" |Votes
! style="background-color:#E9E9E9;text-align:right;" |%
|-
|style="background-color: " |
|align=left|Mikhail Matveyev
|align=left|Communist Party
|68,817
|34.71%
|-
|style="background-color: " |
|align=left|Igor Stankevich (incumbent)
|align=left|United Russia
|65,826
|33.20%
|-
|style="background-color: " |
|align=left|Aleksandr Chernyshev
|align=left|A Just Russia — For Truth
|12,143
|6.12%
|-
|style="background-color: " |
|align=left|Aleksandr Stepanov
|align=left|Liberal Democratic Party
|10,032
|5.06%
|-
|style="background-color: " |
|align=left|Maksim Gnatyuk
|align=left|New People
|9,539
|4.81%
|-
|style="background-color:" |
|align=left|Arina Romanova
|align=left|The Greens
|7,575
|3.82%
|-
|style="background-color:"|
|align=left|Aleksey Dolbilov
|align=left|Party of Pensioners
|7,496
|3.78%
|-
|style="background-color:"|
|align=left|Valery Barsuk
|align=left|Rodina
|3,854
|1.94%
|-
|style="background-color: " |
|align=left|Sergey Stepanov
|align=left|Russian Party of Freedom and Justice
|3,414
|1.72%
|-
| colspan="5" style="background-color:#E9E9E9;"|
|- style="font-weight:bold"
| colspan="3" style="text-align:left;" | Total
| 198,275
| 100%
|-
| colspan="5" style="background-color:#E9E9E9;"|
|- style="font-weight:bold"
| colspan="4" |Source:
|
|}

Notes

References 

Politics of Samara Oblast
Russian legislative constituencies